The Hallinportti Aviation Museum is an aviation museum, located at Halli Airport in Kuorevesi, Jämsä, Finland.

Aircraft
 MiG-15 UTI
 IVL D.26 Haukka II
 Bristol Bulldog IV
 Aero A-11
 Rumpler 6B
 VL Sääski II
 Caudron G.3
 a wide collection of aviation equipment

References

External links
 
 The Hallinportti Aviation Museum's homepage

Aerospace museums in Finland
Jämsä
Museums in Central Finland